Charles Alton (24 December 1891 – 1969) was an English footballer who played as a full back in the Football League for Rotherham County and Brentford.

Career 
A full back, Alton began his career with spells at Spital Olympic, Chesterfield Town, Castleford Town, Doncaster Rovers and Stalybridge Celtic prior to the outbreak of the First World War in 1914. He signed for Second Division club Rotherham County in 1919 and made 55 appearances, scoring one goal during two seasons with the club. Alton joined Third Division South club Brentford in 1921 and he was a virtual ever-present during his time at Griffin Park, making 133 appearances and scoring six goals (all from penalties) before being given a free transfer in August 1925. He ended his career with a spell at Southern League club Northfleet United.

Personal life 
Alton served as a corporal in the Royal Engineers during the First World War.

Career statistics

References

1891 births
1969 deaths
Footballers from Chesterfield
English footballers
Association football fullbacks
Spital Olympic F.C. players
Chesterfield F.C. players
Castleford Town F.C. players
Doncaster Rovers F.C. players
Stalybridge Celtic F.C. players
Rotherham County F.C. players
Brentford F.C. players
Northfleet United F.C. players
English Football League players
Southern Football League players
Midland Football League players
British Army personnel of World War I
Royal Engineers soldiers
Military personnel from Derbyshire